Don Carter may refer to:

Don Carter (bowler) (1926–2012), American professional bowler
Don Carter (businessman) (1933–2018), basketball entrepreneur
Don Carter (footballer) (1921–2002), footballer for Bury FC and Blackburn Rovers
Don Carter (ice hockey) (born 1936), Canadian ice hockey player
Don Carter, creator of the TV short Happy Monster Band